Movements in Colour is an album by British jazz saxophonist and composer Andy Sheppard recorded in 2008 and released on the ECM label.

Reception
The Allmusic review by Thom Jurek awarded the album 3½ stars stating "Movements in Colour is a wonderfully breezy, airy, but very sophisticated recording that places an unusual instrument (the tabla) at the center of a jazz group that defies expectations and delivers something new yet familiar; this set is both well-conceived, and more importantly, well-executed".  Duncan Heining in his review for Jazzwise stated, "...they share a profound and uplifting grasp of the power of colour and that is certainly a word I would have to use in respect of Sheppard’s music. Here it shows in the way these five musicians combine to kaleidoscopic effect that matters most rather than their solo contributions. The impression throughout is of serving the music. "

Track listing
All compositions by Andy Sheppard
 "La Tristesse du Roi" - 14:48 
 "Bing" - 6:00 
 "Nave Nave Moe" - 12:15 
 "Ballarina" - 3:43 
 "May Song" - 6:48 
 "We Shall Not Go to Market Today" - 8:06 
 "International Blue" - 5:41

Personnel
Andy Sheppard - soprano saxophone, tenor saxophone
John Parricelli - acoustic guitar, electric guitar
Eivind Aarset - guitar, electronics
Arild Andersen - double bass, electronics
Kuljit Bhamra - tabla, percussion

References

ECM Records albums
Andy Sheppard albums
2009 albums
Albums produced by Manfred Eicher